This is a complete list of the children, grandchildren, great-grandchildren and great-great-grandchildren of King George V, the founder of the House of Windsor, and his queen Mary of Teck. The list includes deceased members, members who have become Catholic, royal and non-royal, legitimate and illegitimate members openly acknowledged by their parents.

A list of living non-Catholic descendants of George V's sons is shown at line of succession to the British throne. A list of all members of the house of Windsor is at List of members of the House of Windsor.

Table

LEGEND
 CA means excluded from succession for being Roman Catholic
 LG means legitimated by subsequent marriage
 (LG+) first generation or (LG-) later generation

Graphical representation

Timeline

Statistics
, George V has 6 children, 9 grandchildren, 22 great-grandchildren and 52 great-great-grandchildren. Members who are (1) Catholic or (2) illegitimate or legitimated by marriage are excluded from the succession to the throne.

Most of the illegitimate children on this table are all legitimatio per matrimonium subsequens or legitimated by subsequent marriage. They and their descendants are excluded from the line of succession and other titles. Other monarchies are different. Monaco, for instance recognises legitimated children as eligible for the throne.

The Catholics are from the Duke of Kent's family. 
The Duke's wife converted to Catholicism decades after they were married. Her later conversion did not exclude him.
Their oldest son, George Windsor, married his Catholic wife in 1988 and was thereby excluded until 2015, when the Perth Agreement was implemented. Two of his three children are Catholics. Only Lady Amelia Windsor is still in the line, but it is presumed that she will follow the lead of her siblings and parents and be confirmed [in the Catholic faith] when she is older and hence will be excluded from succession.
Their second son, Lord Nicholas Windsor, converted to Catholicism, married his wife in the Vatican, and his three children are baptised Catholics.
The Duke's brother, Prince Michael of Kent, married his Catholic wife in 1978 and was thereby excluded until 2015. His children were raised in communion with the Anglican church and have always been eligible.

Other descendants of Edward VII
In addition to George V, Edward VII had 5 other children, from whom the dukes of Fife and the Norwegian royal family are descended.

See also
British monarchy
British monarchs family tree
List of monarchs in the British Isles

Notes

References

George V Descendants
George V
George V Descendants
George V Descendants
George V Descendants
George V Descendants
Descendants